Ketchup or catsup is a table condiment with a sweet and sour flavor. The unmodified term ("ketchup") now typically refers to tomato ketchup, although early recipes used egg whites, mushrooms, oysters, grapes, mussels, or walnuts, among other ingredients. 

Tomato ketchup is made from tomatoes, sugar, and vinegar, with seasonings and spices. The spices and flavors vary, but commonly include onions, allspice, coriander, cloves, cumin, garlic, and mustard, and sometimes include celery, cinnamon, or ginger. The market leader in the United States (60% market share) and the United Kingdom (82%) is Heinz Tomato Ketchup. Tomato ketchup is most often used as a condiment to dishes that are usually served hot and are fried or greasy: french fries and other potato dishes, hamburgers, hot dogs, chicken tenders, hot sandwiches, meat pies, cooked eggs, and grilled or fried meat. Ketchup is sometimes used as the basis for, or as one ingredient in, other sauces and dressings, and the flavor may be replicated as an additive flavoring for snacks, such as potato chips.

History

Mushroom ketchup

In the United Kingdom, ketchup was historically prepared with mushrooms as a primary ingredient, rather than tomatoes. Ketchup recipes began to appear in British and then American cookbooks in the 18th century. The term ketchup first appeared in 1682. In the United States, mushroom ketchup dates back to at least 1770, and was prepared by British colonists in the Thirteen Colonies.

Tomato ketchup

Many variations of ketchup were created, but the tomato-based version did not appear until around a century after other types. An early recipe for "Tomata Catsup" from 1817 includes anchovies:

 Gather a gallon of fine, red, and full ripe tomatas; mash them with one pound of salt. 
 Let them rest for three days, press off the juice, and to each quart add a quarter of a pound of anchovies, two ounces of shallots, and an ounce of ground black pepper.
 Boil up together for half an hour, strain through a sieve, and put to it the following spices; a quarter of an ounce of mace, the same of allspice and ginger, half an ounce of nutmeg, a drachm of coriander seed, and half a drachm of cochineal. 
 Pound all together; let them simmer gently for twenty minutes, and strain through a bag: when cold, bottle it, adding to each bottle a wineglass of brandy. It will keep for seven years.

By the mid-1850s, the anchovies had been dropped.

James Mease published another recipe in 1812. In 1824, a ketchup recipe using tomatoes appeared in The Virginia Housewife (an influential 19th-century cookbook written by Mary Randolph, Thomas Jefferson's cousin). American cooks also began to sweeten ketchup in the 19th century.

As the century progressed, tomato ketchup began its ascent in popularity in the United States. Ketchup was popular long before fresh tomatoes were. People were less hesitant to eat tomatoes as part of a highly processed product that had been cooked and infused with vinegar and spices. 

Tomato ketchup was sold locally by farmers. Jonas Yerkes is credited as the first American to sell it in a bottle. By 1837, he had produced and distributed the condiment nationally. Shortly thereafter, other companies followed suit. F. & J. Heinz launched their tomato ketchup in 1876. Heinz Tomato Ketchup was advertised: "Blessed relief for Mother and the other women in the household!", a slogan which alluded to the lengthy process required to produce tomato ketchup in the home. With industrial ketchup production and a need for better preservation there was a great increase of sugar in ketchup, leading to the typically sweet and sour formula of today. In Australia, it was not until the late 19th century that sugar was added to tomato sauce, initially in small quantities, but today it contains just as much as American ketchup and only differed in the proportions of tomatoes, salt and vinegar in early recipes.

The Webster's Dictionary of 1913 defined "catsup" as: "table sauce made from mushrooms, tomatoes, walnuts, etc. [Also written as ketchup]."

Modern ketchup emerged in the early years of the 20th century, out of a debate over the use of sodium benzoate as a preservative in condiments. Harvey W. Wiley, the "father" of the Food and Drug Administration in the US, challenged the safety of benzoate which was banned in the 1906 Pure Food and Drug Act.
In response, entrepreneurs including Henry J. Heinz, pursued an alternative recipe that eliminated the need for that preservative. Katherine Bitting, a bacteriologist working for the U.S. Department of Agriculture, carried out research in 1909 that proved increasing the sugar and vinegar content of the product would prevent spoilage without use of artificial preservatives. She was assisted by her husband, Arvil Bitting, an official at that agency.

Prior to Heinz (and his fellow innovators), commercial tomato ketchups of that time were watery and thin, in part due to the use of unripe tomatoes, which were low in pectin. They had less vinegar than modern ketchups; by pickling ripe tomatoes, the need for benzoate was eliminated without spoilage or degradation in flavor. But the changes driven by the desire to eliminate benzoate also produced changes that some experts (such as Andrew F. Smith) believe were key to the establishment of tomato ketchup as the dominant American condiment.

Later innovations

In fast-food outlets, ketchup is often dispensed in small sachets or tubs. Diners tear the side or top and squeeze the ketchup out of the ketchup packets, or peel the foil lid off the tub for dipping. In 2011, Heinz began offering a new measured-portion package, called the "Dip and Squeeze" packet, which can be opened in either way, giving both options.

Some fast food outlets previously dispensed ketchup from hand-operated pumps into paper cups. This method has made a comeback in the first decades of the 21st century, as cost and environmental concerns over the increasing use of individual plastic ketchup tubs were taken into account. 

In October 2000, Heinz introduced colored ketchup products called EZ Squirt, which eventually included green (2000), purple (2001), mystery (pink, orange, or teal, 2002), and blue (2003). These products were made by adding food coloring to the traditional ketchup.  these products were discontinued.

Terminology
The term used for the sauce varies. Ketchup is the dominant term in American English and Canadian English, although catsup is commonly used in some southern US states and Mexico.

In Canada and the US, tomato sauce is not a synonym for ketchup but is a sauce made from tomatoes and commonly used in making sauce for pasta.

Etymology

The etymology of the word ketchup is unclear and has multiple competing theories:

Amoy theory
A popular folk etymology is that the word came to English from the Cantonese "keh jup" (茄汁 ke2 zap1, literally meaning "tomato sauce" in Cantonese). The word "keh" (茄) means "eggplant";"Tomato" in Cantonese is 番茄, which literally translates to "foreign eggplant". 

Another theory among academics is that the word derives from one of two words from Hokkien of the Fujian region of coastal southern China: "kôe-chiap" (in Xiamen and Quanzhou) or "kê-chiap" (in Zhangzhou). Both of these words (膎汁, kôe-chiap and kêchiap) come from either the Quanzhou dialect, Amoy dialect, or Zhangzhou dialect of Hokkien, where it meant the brine of pickled fish (膎, meat; 汁, juice) or shellfish. There are citations of "koe-chiap" in the Dictionary of the Vernacular or Spoken Language of the Amoy (London; Trudner) from 1873, defined as "brine of pickled fish or shell-fish".

Malay theory
Ketchup may have entered the English language from the Malay word kicap (sometimes spelled kecap or ketjap). Originally meaning "soy sauce", the word itself derives from the Chinese terms.

In Indonesian cuisine, which is similar to Malay, the term kecap refers to fermented savory sauces. Two main types are well known in their cuisine: kecap asin which translates to 'salty kecap' in Indonesian (a salty soy sauce) and kecap manis or "sweet kecap" in Indonesian. Kecap manis is a sweet soy sauce that is a mixture of soy sauce with brown sugar, molasses, garlic, ginger, anise, coriander and a bay leaf reduced over medium heat until rather syrupy. A third type, kecap ikan, meaning "fish kecap" is fish sauce similar to the Thai nam pla or the Philippine patis. It is not, however, soy-based.

European-Arabic theory
American anthropologist E. N. Anderson relies on Elizabeth David to claim that ketchup is a cognate of the French , meaning "food in sauce". The word also exists in Spanish and Portuguese forms as escabeche, "a sauce for pickling", which culinary historian Karen Hess traced back to Arabic Kabees, or "pickling with vinegar". The term was anglicized to caveach, a word first attested in the late 17th century, at the same time as ketchup.

Early uses in English

The word entered the English language in Britain during the late 17th century, appearing in print as catchup (1690) and later as ketchup (1711). The following is a list of early quotations collected by the Oxford English Dictionary.

 1690, B. E., A New Dictionary of the Terms Ancient and Modern of the Canting Crew
 Catchup: a high East-India Sauce.
 1711, Charles Lockyer, An Account of the Trade in India 128
 Soy comes in Tubbs from Japan, and the best Ketchup from Tonquin; yet good of both sorts are made and sold very cheap in China.
 1727, Eliza Smith, The Compleat Housewife, or, Accomplish'd Gentlewoman's Companion
 The first published recipe: it included mushrooms, anchovies and horseradish.
 1730, Jonathan Swift, A Panegyrick on the Dean Wks. 1755 IV. I. 142
 And, for our home-bred British cheer, Botargo, catsup, and caveer.
 1748, Sarah Harrison, The Housekeeper's Pocket-Book and Compleat Family Cook. i. (ed. 4) 2,
 I therefore advise you to lay in a Store of Spices, ... neither ought you to be without ... Kitchup, or Mushroom Juice.
 1751, Mrs. Hannah Glasse, Cookery Bk. 309
 It will taste like foreign Catchup.
 1817, Lord Byron, Beppo viii,
 Walk or ride to the Strand, and buy in gross ... Ketchup, Soy, Chili-vinegar, and Harvey ... 
 1832, Vegetable Substances Used for the Food of Man 333
 One ... application of mushrooms is ... converting them into the sauce called Catsup.
 1840, Charles Dickens, Barnaby Rudge (1849) 91/1
 Some lamb chops (breaded, with plenty of ketchup).
 1845, Eliza Acton, Modern Cookery v. (1850) 136 (L.)
 Walnut catsup.
 1862, Macmillan's Magazine. Oct. 466
 He found in mothery catsup a number of yellowish globular bodies.
 1874, Mordecai C. Cooke, Fungi; Their Nature, Influence and Uses 89
 One important use to which several ... fungi can be applied, is the manufacture of ketchup.

Composition 
U.S. Heinz tomato ketchup's ingredients (listed from highest to lowest percentage weight) are: tomato concentrate from red ripe tomatoes, distilled vinegar, high-fructose corn syrup, corn syrup, salt, spice, onion powder, and natural flavoring.

"Fancy" ketchup
Some ketchup in the U.S. is labeled "Fancy". This is a USDA grade, relating to specific gravity. Fancy ketchup has a higher tomato solid concentration than other USDA grades.

Nutrition
The following table compares the nutritional value of ketchup with raw ripe tomatoes and salsa, based on information from the USDA Food Nutrient Database.

Viscosity

Commercial tomato ketchup has an additive, usually xanthan gum, which gives the condiment a pseudoplastic or "shear thinning" property – more commonly known as thixotropic. This increases the viscosity of the ketchup considerably with a relatively small amount added—usually 0.5%—which can make it difficult to pour from a container. However, the shear thinning property of the gum ensures that when a force is applied to the ketchup it will lower the viscosity enabling the sauce to flow. A common method to getting ketchup out of the bottle involves inverting the bottle and shaking it or hitting the bottom with the heel of the hand, which causes the ketchup to flow rapidly. Ketchup in plastic bottles can be additionally manipulated by squeezing the bottle, which also decreases the viscosity of the ketchup inside. Another technique involves inverting the bottle and forcefully tapping its upper neck with two fingers (index and middle finger together). Specifically, with a Heinz ketchup glass bottle, one taps the 57 circle on the neck. This helps the ketchup flow by applying the correct shearing force. These techniques work because of how pseudoplastic fluids behave: their viscosity (resistance to flow) decreases with increasing shear rate. The faster the ketchup is sheared (by shaking or tapping the bottle), the more fluid it becomes. After the shear is removed the ketchup thickens to its original viscosity.

Ketchup is a non-Newtonian fluid, meaning that its viscosity changes under stress and is not constant. It is a shear thinning fluid which means its viscosity decreases with increased shear stress. The equation used to designate a non-Newtonian fluid is as follows: . This equation represents apparent viscosity where apparent viscosity is the shear stress divided by shear rate. Viscosity is dependent on stress. This is apparent when you shake a bottle of tomato sauce/ketchup so it becomes liquid enough to squirt out. Its viscosity decreased with stress.

The molecular composition of ketchup is what creates its pseudoplastic characteristics. Small polysaccharides, sugars, acids, and water make up the majority of the metastable ketchup product, and these small structures are able to move more easily throughout a matrix because of their low mass. While exposed to shear stress, the molecules within the suspension are able to respond quickly and create an alignment within the product. The bonds between the molecules are mostly hydrogen bonds, ionic interactions, and electrostatic interactions, all of which can be broken when subject to stress. Hydrogen bonds are constantly rearranging within a product due to their need to be in the lowest energy state, which further confirms that the bonds between the molecules will be easily disrupted. This alignment only lasts for as long as shear stress is applied. The molecules return to their original disorganized state once the shear stress dissipates.

In 2017, researchers at the Massachusetts Institute of Technology reported the development of a bottle coating that allowed all the product to slip out without leaving a residue.

In 2022, researchers at the University of Oxford found that splatter from a near-empty bottle can be prevented by squeezing more slowly and doubling the diameter of the nozzle.

Separation 
Ketchup is one of the many products that are leachable, meaning that the water within the product migrates together as the larger molecules within the product sediment, ultimately causing water to separate out. This forms a layer of water on top of the ketchup due to the molecular instability within the product. This instability is caused by interactions between hydrophobic molecules and charged molecules within the ketchup suspension.

Pectin is a polysaccharide within tomatoes that has the ability to bind to itself and to other molecules, especially water, around it. This enables it to create a gel-like matrix, dependent on the amount within the solution. Water is a large part of ketchup, due to it being 80% of the composition of distilled vinegar. In order for the water within the ketchup to be at the lowest possible energy state, all of the hydrogen bonds that are able to be made within the matrix must be made. The water bound to the polysaccharide moves more slowly within the matrix, which is unfavorable with respect to entropy. The increased order within the polysaccharide-water complex gives rise to a high-energy state, in which the water will want to be relieved. This concept implies that water will more favorably bind with itself because of the increased disorder between water molecules. This is partially the cause for water leaching out of solution when left undisturbed for a short period of time.

See also 

 Banana ketchup
 Curry ketchup
 Fruit ketchup
 Heinz Tomato Ketchup
 Ketchup as a vegetable
 List of dips
 List of condiments
 List of tomato dishes
 Mustard (condiment)
 Shelf stable food
 Tomato jam
 Tomato paste
 Tomato purée
 Tomato sauce
 Fry sauce

References

Further reading

  On the origin of the 9 g ketchup packet.

External links

 
 Did George Washington use Ketchup? (history and 18th century recipes)
 Learn why ketchup is NOT good for a hot dog (and the Italian Hot Dog)

 
Chinese words and phrases
Condiments
Sauces
Non-Newtonian fluids